Mizzi Griebl (27 February 1872 – 8 June 1952) was an Austrian stage and film actress. She appeared in a number of supporting roles during the silent and early sound era.

Selected filmography
 Oh, Dear Augustine (1922)
 Fatme's Rescue (1922)
 The Iron King (1923)
 The City Without Jews (1924)
 The Family without Morals (1927)
 What Price Love? (1929)
 Devotion (1929)
 The Uncle from Sumatra (1930)
 General Babka (1930)
 Shadows of the Past (1936)
 Hannerl and Her Lovers (1936)

References

Bibliography
 Rogowski, Christian. The Many Faces of Weimar Cinema: Rediscovering Germany's Filmic Legacy. Camden House, 2010.

External links

1872 births
1952 deaths
Austrian film actresses
Austrian silent film actresses
Austrian stage actresses
Actresses from Vienna